The 2011–12 season was Clyde's second consecutive season in the Scottish Third Division, having been relegated from the Scottish Second Division at the end of the 2009–10 season. Clyde also competed in the Challenge Cup, League Cup and the Scottish Cup.

Summary
Berwick Rangers finished ninth in the Third Division. They reached the first round of the Challenge Cup, the second round of the League Cup and the second round of the Scottish Cup.

Results & fixtures

Third Division

Challenge Cup

League Cup

Scottish Cup

Player statistics

Squad 
Last updated 5 May 2012 

 
 
 
 
 

|}

League table

Transfers

Players in

Players out

Notes

Clyde F.C. seasons
Clyde